The Afghan cricket team toured Zimbabwe between 8 and 29 October 2015. The tour consisted of five One Day International (ODI) matches, two Twenty20 Internationals (T20I) and two tour matches. This was the first time that Afghanistan had played a five-match bilateral ODI series.

Afghanistan won the ODI series 3–2 and became the first Associate side to beat a Full Member nation in a multi-game ODI series. Afghanistan won the T20I series 2–0.

Squads

Tour matches

One-day: Zimbabwe Chairman's XI v Afghanistan

One-day: Zimbabwe Chairman's XI v Afghanistan

ODI series

1st ODI

2nd ODI

3rd ODI

4th ODI

5th ODI

T20I series

1st T20I

2nd T20I

References

External links
 Series home at ESPN Cricinfo

2015 in Afghan cricket
2015 in Zimbabwean cricket
International cricket competitions in 2015–16
Afghan cricket tours of Zimbabwe